Tarjumo is a Kanuri liturgical language of Nigeria. Also referred to as "Classical Kanembu," it is a modernized form of Old Kanembu from c. 1400 CE and is unintelligible with modern Kanembu or Kanuri. The name derives from the Arabic verb tarjama (ترجم), meaning "to translate." It is primarily used by Muslim scholars for exegesis of the Qur'an (tafsir) and other Arabic texts.

References

Sacred languages
Saharan languages
Languages of Nigeria